Vespina is a genus of moths of the family Incurvariidae.

Selected species
Vespina nielseni Kozlov, 1987
Vespina quercivora (Davis, 1972)
Vespina slovaciella (Zagulajev & Tokar, 1990)

Other uses
Vespina is the name given to the RAF's VIP transport aircraft, an Airbus Voyager KC2

References
Vespina at funet

Incurvariidae
Adeloidea genera